Down with the King can refer to
 Down with the King (album), a 1993 music album by Run-D.M.C.
 "Down with the King" (song), the title track from the album
 Down with the King (game), 1981 fantasy political card game by Avalon Hill